Yushika Nakamura (born 21 August 1992) is a Japanese professional footballer who plays as a midfielder for WE League club Chifure AS Elfen Saitama.

Club career 
Nakamura made her WE League debut on 20 September 2021.

References 

WE League players
Living people
1992 births
Japanese women's footballers
Women's association football midfielders
Association football people from Tokyo
Chifure AS Elfen Saitama players